Catoptria languidellus is a species of moth in the family Crambidae described by Philipp Christoph Zeller in 1863. It is found in Italy, Switzerland, Austria, the Balkan Peninsula, the Caucasus, Transcaucasia, Armenia and Central Asia (Tannuola, Minussinsk, Ala-Tau).

References

Crambini
Moths of Europe
Moths of Asia
Moths described in 1863